Anwar Akbari (born August 2, 1993) is an Afghan footballer who plays for De Spin Ghar Bazan F.C.

References

Living people
1993 births
Association football midfielders
Afghan men's footballers
Afghanistan international footballers